Genji may refer to:

Genji (era), an era in Japanese history (1864–65)
Hikaru Genji, the main character of the 11th-century Japanese text The Tale of Genji
Genji, an alternative name for the Minamoto clan
Genji (woreda), a district of the Oromia Region, Ethiopia

Video games
 Genji: Dawn of the Samurai, a PlayStation 2 video game
 Genji: Days of the Blade, a PlayStation 3 video game
 Genji  (Overwatch), a player character in the video games Overwatch and Heroes of the Storm
 Genji the Pollen Prophet, a player character in the video game Awesomenauts
 Genji, a character from Pokémon series
 Genji, a rabbit villager in the video game series Animal Crossing

See also 
 Kenji (disambiguation)